Chantiers et Ateliers A. Normand was a French shipyard in Le Havre. They were notable for building small warships in the early part of the 20th century.

They also developed the Normand boiler, an early design of three-drum water-tube boiler.

Shipyards of France
Le Havre